Bayley Alexander Currey (born October 29, 1996) is an American professional stock car racing driver. He competes part-time in the NASCAR Craftsman Truck Series, driving the No. 41 Chevrolet Silverado for Niece Motorsports. He has also competed in the NASCAR Cup Series and NASCAR Xfinity Series in the past.

Racing career
Currey started his go-kart racing career in 2003, later moving up to Bandolero racing. After that, he competed at Central Texas Speedway, driving pro late models.

Craftsman Truck Series
Currey made his Camping World Truck Series debut at Martinsville at the Texas Roadhouse 200, driving the No. 50 truck for Beaver Motorsports. The offer was brought to him by a personal friend. He started 27th and finished 25th. Currey returned in Phoenix, driving the No. 83 for Copp Motorsports. He started 21st, and finished 10th, surviving multiple wrecks in the process. He drove the No. 83 truck again at Homestead, starting 30th and finishing 28th after an engine failure. Currey wound up running 13 Truck races in 2018.

On February 9, 2019, it was announced that Currey and Vizion Motorsports agreed to run a partial schedule in the No. 35 Toyota Tundra for 2019. The announcement came after Currey tested an ARCA Racing Series car for Vizion. In July, he joined Niece Motorsports for the Gander RV 150 at Pocono Raceway, and later finished sixth with the team at Michigan International Speedway.

In 2020, Currey joined CMI Motorsports for the Strat 200 at Las Vegas Motor Speedway. He returned to Niece at Pocono after regular driver Natalie Decker was hospitalized with bile duct complications.

On January 3, 2021, Currey revealed on the Talking in Circles podcast that he would return to Niece in 2021 for another part-time schedule. Although plans were for his season debut to take place at Circuit of the Americas, he did so in April at Kansas in the No. 45 truck after regular driver Brett Moffitt switched to Xfinity points. Currey changed his points declaration to the Truck Series on May 4.

Xfinity Series
A few weeks after competing in the 2018 Stratosphere 200 in the NASCAR Camping World Truck Series, Currey made his NASCAR Xfinity Series debut at Texas Motor Speedway with B. J. McLeod Motorsports. He qualified 23rd and finished 20th after falling back to 30th at the end of Stage 1 and 27th at the end of Stage 2. Currey returned at Loudon in July with JP Motorsports in their No. 55 entry, and piloted the car for most of the remainder of the 2018 season.

On August 15, 2019, leading into the Food City 300 at Bristol, Currey was indefinitely suspended by NASCAR after failing a drug test; Currey, in a statement, said that the failure was due to a banned ingredient (Octodrine) in a pre-workout supplement. He apologized publicly on the night the suspension was announced and asked NASCAR to enter him in to the Road to Recovery program, which is mandatory for members looking to be reinstated by NASCAR. He was reinstated on September 18 after completing the Road to Recovery. He made his racing return at the Charlotte Roval, where he finished 37th.

Currey joined Mike Harmon Racing for the 2020 season, where he ran much of the schedule in the No. 74. He was elevated to a full-time seat with the team in 2021. In the Call 811 Before You Dig 200 at Phoenix Raceway, Currey posted his and MHR's best career finishes of seventh.

On October 15, 2021, Currey stated in an interview with Jayski's Silly Season Site that he was hoping to return to JD Motorsports in 2022. He drove for Mike Harmon Racing for most of the 2021 season until he was taken out of the ride due to other drivers bringing sponsorship. On December 27, JDM announced that Currey would drive one of their cars full-time in 2022. Although he drove the No. 15 in all of his starts for the team in 2021, his car number for 2022 is #4, and is sponsored by the Swedish rock band Ghost.

Cup Series
In March 2019, Currey partnered with Rick Ware Racing for his Monster Energy NASCAR Cup Series debut in the TicketGuardian 500 at ISM Raceway. He was slated to run the Bass Pro Shops NRA Night Race at Bristol with Ware until his suspension. Kyle Weatherman took his place in the 52. 

Currey returned to Ware and the Cup Series in May 2020, driving the No. 53 in the Supermarket Heroes 500 at Bristol. In August, he replaced J. J. Yeley during the Go Bowling 235 on the Daytona road course when Yeley required medical attention due to a failed cooling system.

Currey returned to the series in the 2021 Quaker State 400 at Atlanta, driving the No. 15 for RWR.

Personal life
Currey's father was a race car driver. Bayley attended Texas State University.

Motorsports career results

NASCAR
(key) (Bold – Pole position awarded by qualifying time. Italics – Pole position earned by points standings or practice time. * – Most laps led.)

Cup Series

Xfinity Series

Craftsman Truck Series

 Season still in progress
 Ineligible for series points

References

External links
 
 

NASCAR drivers
Living people
1996 births
People from Hays County, Texas
Racing drivers from Texas